The 2005 Mercedes-Benz Cup was a men's tennis tournament played on outdoor hard courts at the Los Angeles Tennis Center in Los Angeles, California in the United States and was part of the International Series of the 2005 ATP Tour. It was the 79th edition of the Los Angeles Open and the tournament ran from July 25 through July 31, 2003. First-seeded Andre Agassi won his fourth singles title at the tournament and overall last title of his career.

Finals

Singles

 Andre Agassi defeated  Gilles Müller 6–4, 7–5

Doubles

 Rick Leach /  Brian MacPhie defeated  Jonathan Erlich /  Andy Ram 6–3, 6–4

References 

Mercedes-Benz Cup
Los Angeles Open (tennis)
Mercedes-Benz Cup
Mercedes-Benz Cup
Mercedes-Benz Cup
Mercedes-Benz Cup